is a train station in Nishinari-ku, Osaka, Osaka Prefecture, Japan, operated by the private railway operator Nankai Electric Railway.

Lines
Nishi-Tengachaya Station is served by the Koya Line (Shiomibashi Line), and has the station number "NK06-1".

History
The station opened in September 1915.

Adjacent stations

See also
 List of railway stations in Japan

References

External links

  

Railway stations in Osaka Prefecture
Railway stations in Japan opened in 1915